Cymothoe orphnina, the orphnina glider, is a butterfly in the family Nymphalidae. It is found in Nigeria, Cameroon, the Republic of the Congo and the Democratic Republic of the Congo.

Subspecies
Cymothoe orphnina orphnina (Democratic Republic of the Congo: north-east to Kivu and to the Ituri Forest and Aruwiumi River)
Cymothoe orphnina suavis Schultze, 1913 (eastern Nigeria, Cameroon, Congo, south-western Democratic Republic of the Congo)

References

Butterflies described in 1894
Cymothoe (butterfly)
Butterflies of Africa